There were several Arabian tribes that interacted with The Prophet Muhammad(pbuh).

Introduction
The most prominent of such Arabian tribes were Quraish which were in turn divided into several sub-clans. The Qur'aish sub-clan of Banu Hashim was the clan of Muhammad, while their sister sub-clan, the Banu Abd-Shams became known as his most staunch enemies. After Muhammad, the Muslim nation was ruled exclusively through the Quraish tribe, all the way until the Ottoman Turks came into power.

Other tribes include various ones that were centered on different cities, for example the Banu Thaqif and the Banu Utub.

Notable are the Jewish tribes that had settled in Medina, they would play a prominent part in Muhammad's life, this included the Banu Qurayza, Banu Nadir and the Banu Qainuqa, they participated in the Battle of Bu'ath, although they had a truce and an agreement with Muslims not to join the opposing armies, but they broke them.

List
The list includes:
Quraish — prominent in the city of Mecca
Banu Kinanah — the brothers of Quraish, and they are prominent in and mostly around Mecca
Banu al-Akhdari (Branch of quraish), They were very influential in Algeria and Yemen
Banu Bakr ibn Abd Manat — the city of Yalamlam and around Yathrib and they are a branch of Banu Kinanah
Banu Jadhimah — the city of Yalamlam and they are a branch of Banu Kinanah
Banu Hothail — The Brothers of Khuzaimah, and their neighbors in Mecca 
Banu Thaqif — the city of Ta'if, Urwah ibn Mas'ud
Banu Bariq — the city of Bareq
Banu Utub — the city of Najd
Banu Ghatafan — east of Yathrib and Khaibar
Banu Hilal -Hejaz and Najd
Banu Tamim — Dominant force in Central Arabia
Banu Sa'ad
Banu Amr — Umar and his companions stayed with them during the hijrah from Mecca
Banu Daws — south of Mecca Abu Hurairah
Banu Abs — Hudhayfah ibn al-Yaman
Banu Jumah
Banu Kalb
Abd al-Qays
Banu Khuza'a — between Mecca and Badr
Banu Hanifa — they are a branch of Banu Bakr
Banu Lakhm

In Yathrib (later Medina)

Banu Kinanah
Banu Khazraj

Jewish tribes:
Banu Alfageer
Banu Alkahinan — they traced their descent from Aaron
Banu Awf
Banu Aws fled Syria under Ghassanid rule, then fled Yathrib (presently known as Medina), and after expulsion by Muhammed, back to Syria 
Banu Harith or Bnei Chorath were rulers of Najran.
Banu Nadir — sub-clan of the al-Kāhinān, located in Yathrib(Medina)
Banu Najjar
Banu Qainuqa — most powerful of all the Jewish tribes of the peninsula before Islam 
Banu Quda'a — Himyarite tribe of converts to Sadducee Judaism
Banu Qurayza — sub-clan of the al-Kāhinān, located in Yathrib(Medina), "principal family" fled Syria under Ghassanid rule, then fled Medina, after expulsion by Muhammed, back to Syria
Banu Sa'ida
Banu Shutayba

See also
Non-Muslim interactants with Muslims during Muhammad's era
Tribes of Arabia
 Jewish tribes of Arabia

References

External links
https://web.archive.org/web/20071006092639/http://www.yanabi.com/forum/messageview.cfm?catid=79&threadid=5270&forumid=1

 
History of the Jews in the Arabian Peninsula
Islam and Judaism